, also known as SAY, is a television network headquartered in Yamagata Prefecture, Japan.  SAY is the fourth commercial television broadcaster in Yamagata Prefecture, it was started broadcasting in 1997.  

Sakuranbo Television is affiliated with FNN and FNS.  Yamagata Television System (YTS) was the affiliated station of FNN/FNS in Yamagata prefecture. However, in 1993, YTS shifted to All-Nippon News Network (ANN). As a relief measure, Fuji TV established Sakuranbo Television to broadcast its program in Yamagata prefecture. 

In June 2006, Sakuranbo Television started broadcasting digital terrestrial television.

References

External links
 Official website 

Companies based in Yamagata Prefecture
Television stations in Japan
Fuji News Network
Television channels and stations established in 1996